Maddur vada, also known as Maddur vade (pronounced "ma-ddur vah-daa", "ma-ddur vah-dey"), is a savoury fritter-type snack from South India. The snack derives its name from the town of Maddur which is in the Mandya district of Karnataka. Maddur lies between the cities of Bangalore and Mysore and Maddur Vada is frequently sold on trains that traverse these two cities. It is made of rice flour, semolina and maida flour which are mixed with sliced onion, curry leaves, green chillies, grated coconut, cashews / groundnuts, ghee, salt, and asafoetida. The onion and curry leaves are fried in a little amount of oil and then mixed with water to make a soft dough. A small amount of dough is taken and made into a patty and then deep fried in oil until it turns golden-brown to make Maddur vade. Maddur Vada is served hot with fresh coconut chutney.

See also
 Cuisine of Karnataka

References

 https://m.timesofindia.com/city/bengaluru/This-vade-makes-Maddur-special/articleshow/14739302.cms

Karnataka cuisine